Manuel Teixeira  (April 15, 1912 - September 15, 2003) was a diocesan priest of the Diocese of Macao, an historian, and the leading expert in the Kristang language.  He is the author of A Grammar of Kristang published in the 1950s.

He lived most of his life in Macau, having arrived there in 1924 to begin studies for the priesthood, returning to Portugal in 2001.

References
 

Linguists
20th-century Jesuits